Axius was a Paeonian river god, the son of Oceanus and Tethys. He was the father of Pelagon, by Periboea, daughter of Acessamenus. His domain was the river Axius, or Vardar, in Macedonia (region).

The river god was an ancestor of Euphemus and his son, Eurybarus, the hero who slew the drakaina Sybaris.

See also 
  for Jovian asteroid 5648 Axius

References 

 Hyginus Preface
 Iliad 21.141; Bibliotheca E4.7

Paeonian mythology
Potamoi